Serena and Venus Williams were the defending champions but withdrew in the third round.

Lisa Raymond and Rennae Stubbs defeated Kim Clijsters and Ai Sugiyama in the final, 6–4, 6–3 to win the ladies' doubles tennis title at the 2001 Wimbledon Championships.

Seeds

  Lisa Raymond /  Rennae Stubbs (champions)
  Virginia Ruano Pascual /  Paola Suárez (semifinals)
  Cara Black /  Elena Likhovtseva (second round)
  Serena Williams /  Venus Williams (third round, withdrew)
  Kimberly Po-Messerli /  Nathalie Tauziat (semifinals)
  Els Callens /  Meghann Shaughnessy (first round)
  Jelena Dokić /  Conchita Martínez (third round)
  Nicole Arendt /  Caroline Vis (second round)
  Kim Clijsters /  Ai Sugiyama (final)
  Alexandra Fusai /  Rita Grande (second round)
  Nicole Pratt /  Elena Tatarkova (first round)
  Tathiana Garbin /  Janette Husárová (third round)
  Anke Huber /  Barbara Schett (first round)
  Amanda Coetzer /  Lori McNeil (third round)
  Tina Križan /  Katarina Srebotnik (second round)
  Martina Navratilova /  Arantxa Sánchez Vicario (quarterfinals)

Qualifying

Draw

Finals

Top half

Section 1

Section 2

Bottom half

Section 3

Section 4

References

External links

2001 Wimbledon Championships on WTAtennis.com
2001 Wimbledon Championships – Women's draws and results at the International Tennis Federation

Women's Doubles
Wimbledon Championship by year – Women's doubles